Artem Mykhaylovych Sukhotskyi (born 6 December 1992) is a Ukrainian professional footballer who plays as a defender.

Career
He is a product of the Dynamo Kyiv sportive school. On 12 January 2012 Sukhotskyi signed a contract with Illichivets Mariupol in the Ukrainian Premier League.

Zorya Luhansk
In 2016 he moved to Zorya Luhansk where he manage to play 40 matches scoring one goal and get the third place in Ukrainian Premier League in the season 2016–17.

Slovan Bratislava
In 2018 he moved to Slovan Bratislava where he in the season 2018–19 he won the Slovak Super Liga and in 2020 he won the Slovak Cup.

Dinamo Minsk
In 2020 he moved to Dinamo Minsk where he played 25 match in Belarusian Premier League.

Desna Chernihiv
On 19 February 2021 he moved to Desna Chernihiv, the main club of Chernihiv, becoming the second most expensive player of the club, after Oleksiy Hutsulyak. On 26 February 2021 he made his debut in Ukrainian Premier League, with the new team against Inhulets Petrove at the Valeriy Lobanovskyi Dynamo Stadium ended 3-0 for Desna. On 16 July 2021 with the club decided to don't continue the cooperation and the contract ended.

Chornomorets Odesa
On 23 December 2021, rumors associated him to be closed to sign for Chornomorets Odesa in Ukrainian Premier League, and in January 2022, the rumors were confirmed and the player moved to the club of Odessa. In June 2022 his contract with the club was terminated.

International
In 2007 he was called up to the Ukraine U16, where in two years he managed to play 12 matches. In 2009 he managed to play 3 matches in Ukraine U17. He also played 12 matches and scored 3 goals from 2009 to 2010.

Career statistics

Club

International

Honours
ŠK Slovan Bratislava
Slovak Super Liga (1): 2018–19
Slovak Cup (1): 2020

Oleksandriya
Ukrainian First League (1): 2014–15
Ukrainian First League: Runner-Up 2013–14

Gallery

References

External links
 
 
 
 

1992 births
Living people
Piddubny Olympic College alumni
Association football defenders
Footballers from Nizhyn
Ukrainian footballers
Ukrainian expatriate footballers
Ukraine youth international footballers
FC Dynamo Kyiv players
FC Dynamo-2 Kyiv players
FC Mariupol players
FC Oleksandriya players
FC Zorya Luhansk players
ŠK Slovan Bratislava players
FC Dinamo Minsk players
FC Desna Chernihiv players
FC Chornomorets Odesa players
Slovak Super Liga players
Belarusian Premier League players
Ukrainian Premier League players
Ukrainian First League players
Expatriate footballers in Slovakia
Expatriate footballers in Belarus
Ukrainian expatriate sportspeople in Slovakia
Ukrainian expatriate sportspeople in Belarus